Haridas is a 1944 Tamil language film directed by Sundar Rao Nadkarni and starring M. K. Thyagaraja Bhagavathar, T. R. Rajakumari and N. C. Vasanthakokilam.

It holds the record of being the longest-running Tamil film at a single theatre for 784 days. IBN Live included Haridas in its list of 100 greatest Indian films of all time. The film was initially released in black and white with just one scene in colour, which was manually colored by studio technicians. The film was re-released with full colour in 1946. It was the last film of M. K. Thyagaraja Bhagavathar before his two year imprisonment due to the Lakshmikanthan murder case.

Plot 
Haridas (Thyagaraja Bhagavathar) is a vain individual who spends his life in luxury and lust, ignored his parents for wife (Vasanthakokilam), ignoring his wife for a courtesan (T. R. Rajakumari). But when his wealth is appropriated by the courtesan, he realizes life's realities, reforms and spends the rest of his days serving his parents and God.

Cast 
Cast according to the song book:

Male
 M. K. Thyagaraja Bhagavathar as Haridas
 P. B. Rangachari as Mahamunivar
 T. E. K. Achariar as Haridas's Father
 Annaji Rao as Lakshmi's Father
 S. R. Krishna Iyengar as Kannan
 N. S. Krishnan as Zamindar
 P. R. Rajagopala Iyer as Head Villager
 P. Ramaiah Sastri as Chettiar
 T. R. Ramasamy as Madhavi Das

Female
 N. C. Vasanthakokilam as Lakshmi, Haridas's Wife
 T. R. Rajakumari as Ramba (Dasi)
 M. A. Radha Bai as Harida's Mother
 T. A. Mathuram as Sarada, Ramba's Cook
 Baby Harini as Krishnan
 Pandari Bai

Production 
Haridas was directed by Sundar Rao Nadkarni, a Marathi film director, and produced by Rayal Talkie Distributors, a Madurai based Textile Yarn and Dye merchants at Central Studios in Coimbatore. The film was adapted from the book Sri Krishna Vijayam by Elangovan. It was based on the story of the life of a poet-saint called Haridas. The role of Haridas was played by M. K. Thyagaraja Bhagavathar, who was the highest-paid actor in the Tamil film industry at the time. It was very short (10,994 Feet) compared to other films from the same period. Featuring a number of melodious songs sung by Bhagavathar, the film was released on Diwali (16 October) 1944. Classical musician N. C. Vasanthakokilam, who was often compared to M. S. Subbulakshmi as a singer, played the role of Haridas' wife. The film also marked the debut of renowned Tamil actress Pandari Bai. The comedic duo of N. S. Krishnan and T. A. Mathuram were cast in this film. The  film was shot at Central Studios, Coimbatore.

Soundtrack 
All songs in this film became hits. The song "Manmadha Leelayai Vendrar Undo" celebrating erotic love has become an enduring hit and the phrase has entered every day Tamil usage. Papanasam Sivan was the composer and G. Ramanathan was in charge of the orchestration. A partial list of songs from Haridas:

Two songs, sung by N. C. Vasanthakokilam ('Enadhu Manam Thulli Vilaiyaaduthe' and 'Kannaa Vaa') were recorded by HMV distinct from the film version of these songs and were released with black label. (See External links for link)

Reception 
Haridas hit the theatres on Diwali (16 October) 1944. It was a huge success and ran for three consecutive Diwalis at the Sun Theatres in Broadway, Madras. Across theatres it had an uninterrupted theatrical run of 133 weeks. With the profits earned from the film, the producers established a knitting company in Madurai. Bhagavathar became the Tamil cinema industry's highest paid star. However, he was not able to enjoy his success as he was arrested in November 1944 as a suspect in the Lakshmikanthan murder case. IBN Live included the film in its list of 100 greatest Indian films of all time.

References

External links 

 
  (In public domain in India)
  (In public domain in India)
  (In public domain in India)
  (In public domain in India)
  - Sung by N. C. Vasanthakokilam
  - Sung by N. C. Vasanthakokilum

Bibliography 

1944 films
Indian biographical films
1940s Tamil-language films
Films scored by G. Ramanathan
1940s biographical films
Indian black-and-white films
Films scored by Papanasam Sivan
Films directed by Sundar Rao Nadkarni